Flavius Antoninus Messala Vivianus (fl. 459–463) was an administrator of the Eastern Roman Empire.


Biography

Vivianus was the father of Paulus (Consul in 512) and Adamantius.  His full nomenclature is found on a monument from an uncertain province, indicating that he held the ranks of vir illustris and patricius, and that he had been praetorian prefect and consul ordinarius.

He was praetorian prefect of the East between 459 and 460. In 463 he was appointed Consul by the Eastern court, but he was not recognised in the West, where the only consul was Caecina Decius Basilius.

References

Sources
 Arnold Hugh Martin Jones, John Robert Martindale, John Morris, "Fl. Vivianus 2", The Prosopography of the Later Roman Empire, Cambridge University Press, 1971, pp. 1179–1180.

Further reading
 H. Taeuber, and E. Weber, "Un consule del quinto secolo e un oggetto enigmatico", in M.L. Caldelli, G.L. Gregori, S. Orlandi (eds) (2008), Epigrafia 2006: Atti della XIVe rencontre sur l'épigraphie in onore di Silvio Panciera con altri contributi di colleghi, alievi e collaboratori (Rome, 2008), pp. 1063-69

5th-century Romans
5th-century Roman consuls
Imperial Roman consuls
Patricii
Praetorian prefects of the East